The Biz Suxx (also known as The Biz Suxx (But We Don't Care)) is the second studio album by the British glam metal band Wrathchild, released in 1988.

The line "I look like a star but I'm still on the dole" from the title track is a reference to Mott the Hoople's song "All the Way from Memphis".

Track listing
All songs written and composed by Wrathchild
 "The Biz Suxx" – 3:26
 "££ Millionaire $$" – 3:19
 "Hooked" – 2:53
 "(Na Na) Nuklear Rokket" – 3:20
 "Wild Wild Honey" – 3:14
 "Ring My Bell" – 3:34
 "Hooligunz" – 3:32
 "She'z No Angel" – 4:32
 "O.K. U.K." – 3:24
 "Noo Sensation" – 3:42
 "Stikky Fingerz" – 3:40

Personnel
Wrathchild
 Rocky Shades - vocals
 Lance Rocket - guitar
 Marc Angel - bass
 Eddie Starr - drums

Production
Guy Bidmead - producer
Alan McKerchar - engineer

References

1988 albums
Wrathchild albums